4-MBC may refer to:

 4-Methylbenzylcathinone, or Benzedrone, a synthetic stimulant
 4-Methylbenzylidene camphor, a UVB-resistant camphor derivative